Damir Skomina (born 5 August 1976) is a Slovenian former UEFA Elite category football referee.

Refereeing career
Skomina was the fourth referee at several UEFA Euro 2008 matches. He refereed the quarter-final match of the football tournament at the 2008 Summer Olympics.

Skomina refereed the second leg of the 2011–12 UEFA Champions League round of 16 match between Arsenal and Milan. He also refereed in the Champions League quarter-final match between Chelsea and Benfica at Stamford Bridge on 4 April 2012.
 
At UEFA Euro 2012, Skomina refereed three matches: two group matches and a quarterfinal between Germany and Greece. Later that year, he was appointed as a referee at the 2012 UEFA Super Cup between Chelsea and Atlético Madrid.

He was the fourth official in the 2013 UEFA Champions League Final.

Damir Skomina was unveiled as the referee for 2015–16 UEFA Champions League second-leg semi-final fixture between Real Madrid and Manchester City at the Santiago Bernabéu on 4 May 2016.

He refereed 4 matches at UEFA Euro 2016. Refereeing 2 group stage matches. he was the referee at the final round of 16 fixture between England and Iceland, as well as the quarter-final match between Wales and Belgium at UEFA Euro 2016.

He was appointed as the referee for the 2017 UEFA Europa League Final, between Ajax and Manchester United on 24 May.

On 29 March 2018, FIFA announced that he will officiate some matches at 2018 FIFA World Cup along with Jure Praprotnik and Robert Vukan as assistant referees.

On 13 February 2019, he cancelled a goal from Ajax using VAR in the first time of UEFA Champions League history.
Skomina was selected to officiate in the 2019 UEFA Champions League Final between English clubs Tottenham and Liverpool at Metropolitano Stadium in Madrid on 1 June 2019. Skomina awarded Liverpool a penalty kick 20 seconds into the match after Moussa Sissoko stopped a cross by Sadio Mane with his arm. Mohamed Salah scored the penalty for Liverpool, who went on to win 2–0.
 
Skomina officiated the iconic 2019–20 UEFA Champions League quarter-final match between Barcelona and Bayern Munich played at the Estádio da Luz in Lisbon, Bayern Munich won the match 8–2, inflicting Barcelona's worst defeat in 69 years.

In August 2021, he retired as referee due to health problems, specifically his knees.

FIFA World Cup

References

1976 births
Living people
Sportspeople from Koper
Slovenian football referees
UEFA Champions League referees
UEFA Euro 2012 referees
UEFA Euro 2016 referees
2018 FIFA World Cup referees